The 1964–65 Romanian Hockey League season was the 35th season of the Romanian Hockey League. Six teams participated in the league, and Steaua Bucuresti won the championship.

Regular season

External links
hochei.net

Rom
Romanian Hockey League seasons
1964–65 in Romanian ice hockey